Kavita Patidar is an Indian politician, who is a member of the Rajya Sabha, the upper house of the Parliament of India, from Madhya Pradesh. She is the  Indore district panchayat chairperson in the Madhya Pradesh unit of the Bharatiya Janata Party.

References

Bharatiya Janata Party politicians from Madhya Pradesh
Women members of the Rajya Sabha
Rajya Sabha members from Madhya Pradesh
Living people
1975 births
Rajya Sabha members from the Bharatiya Janata Party